Central Stadium (Tsentralnyi stadion) is a multi-purpose stadium in Zhytomyr, Ukraine. The decent size stadium had over 20,000 seats before reconstruction (21,928). However after demolition of unsafe terraces the stadium hosts 5,928 spectators.

Built in 1951 as part of the Dynamo Sports Club, it was originally named as "Dynamo". In 1959 the stadium was transferred to the Avanhard Republican Volunteer Sports Society and the first major renovations took place at the stadium. It served as a home field of the society's football section that eventually grew into a team of masters (a professional club). During another sports reorganization the stadium was transferred to the Spartak Volunteer Sports Society and soon it was renamed in a memory of the Lenin Communist Union of Youth of Ukraine (LKSMU). The latest renovations were taking place before the 1980 Summer Olympics in 1980. Since 2005 the stadium is in emergency conditions. 

After the main association football club of the region withdrew from national competitions in 2005, the stadium was transferred under the ownership of community and was renamed as the Central Stadium. It required some major renovations already in 2005, which were mostly complete by March 2021. On 26 March 2021, Polissya Zhytomyr hosted Krystal Kherson in first official match on stadium in 16 years.

See also
 FC Polissya Zhytomyr

References

External links
 Rozdum, S. Zaya Zedovych Avdysh plans to revive in Zhytomyr FC Polissya (Зая Зедович Авдыш - планирует возродить в Житомире ФК "Полесье"). Zhytomyr magazine. March 11, 2010.
 Stadium's photos, more photos
 Bohinsky, S. Reconstruction of the Zhytomyr Central Stadium. Zhytomyr Region State Tele and Radio Company. August 8, 2013. (video)
 Situation at the stadium. zhytomyr.info. (video)
 A football stadium is built in Hlybochytsia. Zhytomyr still awaits reconstruction of its Central. Reporter of Zhytomyr. August 14, 2013.

1951 establishments in Ukraine
Football venues in Ukraine
Multi-purpose stadiums in Ukraine
Buildings and structures in Zhytomyr
Sport in Zhytomyr
Sports venues in Zhytomyr Oblast